Kazim Jarwali (born 15 June 1955) is an Indian Urdu language poet.

Biography
He settled in Lucknow and married to daughter of shia scholar of Lucknow Ayatullah Saeedul Millat Abqati, the lineage of abqati family.

Literary career
He is also known as "Shair-e-Fikr". He has written several collections of Urdu poetry and participated in several mushairas. He has received awards for his literary work.

See also

 List of Urdu language poets

References

Writers from Lucknow
1955 births
Living people
Urdu-language poets from India